The Ministry of Education and Religious Affairs was a government ministry of the State of Pasundan. The ministry was responsible for the schools, university, and religious matters in the State of Pasundan.

Transfer of power
After the establishment of the Adil Cabinet on 8 May 1948, prime minister Adil Puradiredja appointed Otto Judakusumah as the Minister of Education and Religious Affairs. The formation of the ministry was done a month later, on 11 June 1948, after the handover of the authority from the Recomba (government commissioner for administrative affairs) to the Minister of Justice. The instrument of transfer for this purpose was the Staatsblaad (State Gazette) 1948 No. 116.

Even though most of the authorities regarding to education and religion was given to the ministry, the federal government still managed matters relating to secondary educations, higher educations (university) and the supply of textbooks and other educational equipment. Nevertheless, the limitations in the ministry was less than the limitations in other ministries.

Goals 
According to the ministry, the goals for the education in the State of Pasundan are as the following:
 Raising the standard of education in the State of Pasundan to a level equivalent to that of other nations as soon as possible.
 To lead children and youth, based on their abilities, so that the future society of the state would consist of intellectual citizens which could properly fulfill the task assigned to them, optimistic citizens which could create innovations, and pride citizens which aware of his own worth and his people, in accordance with the spirit of an independent society.
 Spiritual education, which is moral education and character formation in a pedagogical sense. In additional to the education, the ministry also provides a new form of spiritual education: to make students aware of its original nature, so that he is not tossed to and fro by all kinds of worldly events, but remains firm and has a hold on faith in God.

Division of ministry
After the formation of the Anwar Cabinet on 11 January 1950, the Ministry of Education and Religious Affairs was divided into two different ministries: the Ministry of Education, headed by Minister Otto Judakusumah, and the Ministry of Religious Affairs, headed by Minister Ahmad Hassan.

Ministers

Bibliography

References

Notes

Government ministries of Pasundan
Ministries established in 1948
Ministries disestablished in 1950